Oklahoma Badlands is a 1948 American Western film directed by Yakima Canutt and written by Robert Creighton Williams. The film stars Allan Lane, Eddy Waller, Mildred Coles, Roy Barcroft, Gene Roth and Earle Hodgins. The film was released on February 22, 1948 by Republic Pictures.

Plot

Cast   
Allan Lane as Allan Rocky Lane
Black Jack as Rocky's Stallion Black Jack
Eddy Waller as Nugget
Mildred Coles as Leslie Rawlins
Roy Barcroft as Henchman Sanders
Gene Roth as Oliver Budge 
Earle Hodgins as Jonathan Walpole
Dale Van Sickel as Henchman Sharkey
Jay Kirby as Ken Rawlins
Claire Whitney as Agatha Scragg
Terry Frost as Sheriff
Hank Patterson as Postmaster Fred
House Peters, Jr. as The Dude
Jack Kirk as Stage Driver Parker

References

External links 
 

1948 films
American Western (genre) films
1948 Western (genre) films
Republic Pictures films
American black-and-white films
Films directed by Yakima Canutt
1940s English-language films
1940s American films